Eucalyptus tephrodes is a species of small tree or mallee that is endemic to Western Australia. It has rough bark on the trunk and larger branches, smooth bark above, egg-shaped to lance-shaped adult leaves, flower buds in groups of three on the ends of branchlets and cup-shaped to hemispherical fruit.

Description
It has rough, fibrous or flaky bark on the trunk and larger branches, smooth and glaucous bark on the branchlets. Flowering has been recorded in November and December.

Taxonomy and naming
Eucalyptus tephrodes was first formally described in 2000 by Lawrie Johnson and Ken Hill in the journal Telopea. The specific epithet is from ancient Greek meaning "ash-grey" and "resembling", referring to the greyish glaucous foliage.

Distribution and habitat
This eucalypt is found among granite outcrops, along creek edges and in savannah woodlands in the south-east Kimberley centred around Halls Creek with a disjunct occurrence in the east Pilbara. It grows in red sandy-loamy soils over granite.

Conservation status
This eucalypt is classified as "not threatened" by the Western Australian Government Department of Parks and Wildlife.

See also
List of Eucalyptus species

References

Eucalypts of Western Australia
Trees of Australia
tephrodes
Myrtales of Australia
Plants described in 2000
Taxa named by Lawrence Alexander Sidney Johnson
Taxa named by Ken Hill (botanist)